The Naval Front Clasp was a World War II German military decoration awarded to officers and men of the Kriegsmarine in recognition of long, front line service for all naval units, except the submarine service, which had their own clasp to award. This bronze clasp was awarded for service or valor above that of the basic war badge. The award was instituted on 19 November 1944 by Grand Admiral Karl Dönitz.

Notes

References 
 
 Klietmann, Kurt-Gerhard (1981) (in German). Auszeichnungen des Deutschen Reiches. 1936–1945. Stuttgart, Germany: Motorbuch .

Military awards and decorations of Nazi Germany